Myriacantherpestes is an extinct genus of spiny millipedes from the Pennsylvanian subperiod of the Carboniferous period, known from fossils in Europe and North America.

Description 
Like other Euphoberiids, Myriacantherpestes had prominent dorsal and lateral spines. Myriacantherpestes differs from other members of Euphoberiidae in part by having much longer lateral spines.

Taxonomic history
Several species currently assigned to Myriacantherpestes were formerly in the genera Acantherpestes and Euphoberia. The species M. excrescens was originally described as a fossilized cycad seed.

References 

†Myriacantherpestes
Prehistoric myriapod genera
Carboniferous myriapods
Extinct animals of Europe
Extinct animals of North America
Fossil taxa described in 1979